Billancourt may refer to:

 Billancourt, Somme, commune in the Somme department
 Boulogne-Billancourt, commune in the western suburbs of Paris
 Billancourt (Paris Métro)